Forget the World is the debut studio album by Dutch music producer and DJ Afrojack. It was released on 16 May 2014. Afrojack said of the album title, "It's basically a message not just to my fans, but also to myself, to always remember to keep following your heart, keep following your path, and never try to let the things around you get you down."

Singles
"As Your Friend" featuring Chris Brown was released on 13 February 2013. It reached number 21 on the UK Singles Chart. The song appears on the album as a bonus track on the deluxe version.

"The Spark" featuring Spree Wilson was released as the album's lead single on 11 October 2013. The song entered the UK Singles Chart at number 17.

"Ten Feet Tall" featuring Wrabel was released on 3 February 2014, as the album's second single. It was released in the UK on 18 May 2014, alongside the David Guetta remix 2 days after the album's release.

"Dynamite" featuring Snoop Dogg was released on 17 April 2014, as the album's third single.

Reception

Critical reception

At Rolling Stone, Christopher R. Weingarten rated the album three stars out of five, stating that "anything that's not glowing with Afrojack's trademark explosions and monster melodies... is a blown opportunity." David Jeffries of AllMusic rated the album three stars out of five, writing that "Forget the World plays more like a collection of 12"s than a well-tempered album." At USA Today, Elysa Gardner rated the album three stars out of five, saying that "these new tracks represent EDM at its most breezily accessible". Paul McInnes of The Guardian rated the album one star out of five, stating that the release has only "one truly poignant moment."

Commercial performance
In the United States, the album debuted at number 32 on the Billboard 200, with first-week sales of 8,000 copies. It also debuted at number two on Billboard's Dance/Electronic Albums chart.

Track listing

Notes
 signifies a co-producer
 signifies a remixer
"Freedom" features a sample from "Hero" by Nas.

Personnel

 Afrojack - primary artist, all instrumentation (drums, keyboards), all programming (drum, keyboard, MIDI), orchestral arrangements, arranger, engineer, mixing, producer, remixing, additional production
 DJ Buddha - executive producer, all programming (drum, keyboard, MIDI), arranger, engineer, mixing, co-producer
 Polow da Don - executive producer, all programming (drum, keyboard, MIDI), arranger, engineer, mixing, co-producer
Technical production
 Falco Borsboom - arranger, engineer
 Ruud Peeters - arranger, orchestral arrangements
 Ron Cuijpers - arranger
 Guido Dieteren - arranger
 Duncan Fuller - assistant (^)
 Dan Grech-Marguerat - engineer, mixing, mixing engineer (^)
 Randy Urbanski - engineer, mixing, vocal engineer
 Rob Mathes - engineer, vocal producer
 Jamie Siegel - engineer, vocal producer
 Tom Hough - engineer (^)
 Patrick Mühren - engineer (^)
 Paolo "Shirazi" Prudencio - Singer, Songwriter
 Jamie Schefman - engineer
 Jelle van der Voet - engineer
 D-Wayne - keyboard programming, MIDI programming
 Dave Kutch - mastering
 John Hanes - mixing engineer (^)
 Serban Ghenea - mixing (^)
 Dave Fridmann - programming (^)
 Matthew Koma - vocal engineer, vocal producer
 Greg Kurstin - vocal engineer, vocal producer
 Andrew Drucker - vocal engineer
 Jarett Holmes - vocal engineer
 Mark Evan Maxwell - vocal engineer
 Jesse Shatkin - vocal engineer
 Brian Springer - vocal engineer (^)
 Tim Pagnotta - vocal producer
Additional musicians
 Rob Zeguers - double bass
 Tim McEwan - guitar
 Dennis van Leeuwen - guitar
 Andrew Kierszenbaum - keyboards, piano
 Tearce Kizzo - keyboards, piano
 Guido Dieteren - orchestra leader
 Matthew Koma - vocals, guitar
 Wrabel - vocals, piano
 Paolo "Shirazi" Prudencio - background vocals, vocals
 Chris Brown - vocals
 Devin Cruise - vocals
 Tyler Glenn - vocals
 Jack McManus - vocals
 Snoop Dogg - vocals
 Spree Wilson - vocals
 Sting - vocals
 Wiz Khalifa - vocals
 Keane
Jesse Quin - backing vocals, bass, keyboards, percussion
Richard Hughes - backing vocals, drums, percussion
Tim Rice-Oxley - backing vocals, piano, percussion, keyboards
Tom Chaplin - lead vocals, keyboards
Guido's Orchestra
 Judith Groen - cello
 Marije de Jong - cello
 Nele Stuyck - cello
 Guido Rooyakkers - horn
 Cleo Simons - horn
 Lars Wachelder - horn
 Nadia al Hajjar - viola
 Anna Dushkina - viola
 Nadine Hilkens - viola
 Kim de Beer - violin
 Mariam Buzghulashvili - violin
 Ewelina Krysiak - violin
 Marta Lemanska - violin
 Annelieke Marselje - violin
 Marleen Matser - violin
 Julia Rusanovsky - violin
 Aleksandra Stadniczenko - violin
 Anne van Eck - violin
Other personnel
 Dean Gillard - A&R
 Daniel Werner - A&R
 Todd Russell - art direction, design
 Jasja Heijboer - booking
 Joel Zimmerman - booking
 Ryan Gillmor - digital editing
 Thomas Deelder - executive producer, management
 Hugo Langras - executive producer, management
 Dawn Miller - public relations

(^) = deluxe version

Credits adapted from AllMusic.

Charts

Weekly charts

Year-end charts

Release history

Certifications

References

2014 debut albums
Afrojack albums
Albums produced by Polow da Don